Methylbutyrate may refer to:

 Methyl butyrate, the methyl ester of butyric acid
 2-Methylbutyrate, the conjugate base of 2-methylbutyric acid (2-methylbutanoic acid)
 3-Methylbutyrate, the conjugate base of 3-methylbutyric acid (3-methylbutanoic acid)